Several Japanese ships have been named Hamana:

, a replenishment ship of the Japan Maritime Self-Defense Force launched in  1961 and decommissioned in 1987
, a Towada-class replenishment ship of the Japan Maritime Self-Defense Force launched in 1989

References

Japanese Navy ship names
Japan Maritime Self-Defense Force ship names